Peter Pond Lake is a glacial lake in the north-western part of the Canadian province of Saskatchewan. It is located in the boreal Forest and Canadian Shield within the Churchill River drainage basin.

Description 

Peter Pond Lake was on the fur trade route to the Methye Portage which connected eastern Canada to the MacKenzie River area. The lake is a long oval tending to the north-west. A peninsula which almost reaches the west shore divides it into Big Peter Pond (the northern two thirds) and Little Peter Pond. On the east side of Little Peter Pond a narrow isthmus separates it from Churchill Lake, the two forming a broad "V". The La Loche River, which drains Lac La Loche comes in from the north while the Dillon River, with the village of Dillon at its mouth, comes in from the west. The lake drains into Churchill Lake through the Kisis Channel at Buffalo Narrows. Originally called Big and Little Buffalo Lakes, it was renamed after Peter Pond in 1931. It is on Highway 155 which passes through Buffalo Narrows.

Buffalo Narrows Sand Dunes Park 
The park is on a peninsula that separates "Big" and "Little" Peter Pond Lake. Amenities include a picnic area and change rooms. Access is from Highway 155. The park was originally Crown land and operated by the Saskatchewan government but was transferred to the local community of Buffalo Narrows in 2003. The sandy beaches are a nesting site for the endangered piping plover.

Fish species 
The lake's fish species include: walleye, sauger, yellow perch, northern pike, lake trout, lake whitefish, cisco, white sucker, longnose sucker and burbot.

See also 
List of lakes of Saskatchewan
Geography of Saskatchewan
Tourism in Saskatchewan

References 

Lakes of Saskatchewan
Dunes of Canada